The Social Democratic Party of Macedonia (Socijal-demokratska partija na Makedonija, SDPM) is a political party in North Macedonia.

History
Established in 1990, the SDPM was the first political party to register in Macedonia, with Slavko Milosavlevski becoming its founding president. It contested the 1990 parliamentary elections, at a time when Macedonia was still part of Yugoslavia. It received 1.6% of the vote in the first round and 0.2 in the second, failing to win a seat. It also ran in alliance with the Union of Reform Forces in some areas, but the alliance failed to win a seat.

Despite seeing its vote share fall to 1.2% in the first round of the 1994 elections, the party managed to win a single seat in the Assembly.

The SDPM did not contest the 1998 elections, but returned to run in the 2002 elections. However, the party received just 0.3% of the vote and failed to win a seat. The 2006 elections saw the party increase its vote share to 0.9%, but it remained seatless. In the 2008 elections its vote share fell to 0.65%, as the party again failed to win a seat. In the 2011 elections the party's vote share fell to just 0.2%. The 2014 elections saw it receive 0.4% of the vote, remaining seatless.

References

1990 establishments in the Socialist Republic of Macedonia
Political parties established in 1990
Political parties in Yugoslavia
Social democratic parties
Socialist parties in North Macedonia